State Trunk Highway 86 (often called Highway 86, STH-86 or WIS 86) is a state highway in the U.S. state of Wisconsin. It runs east–west in north central Wisconsin from Ogema to Tomahawk.

Route description

The roadway transitions from County Trunk Highway O (CTH-O) to WIS 86 at the WIS 13 intersection west of Ogema. After crossing the Pine Line Trail in Ogema, WIS 86 then turns north and then east again. Continuing east, WIS 86 intersects WIS 102. Continuing further east, WIS 86 then crosses above the Wisconsin River. After the crossing, it then turns north towards downtown Tomahawk. In downtown, it first intersects CTH-S (former WIS 107) and then turns east once again. Further east, it then meets US Highway 51 (US 51) at a diamond interchange. At this point, WIS 86 ends there, and the roadway continues east as CTH-D.

History
Initially, in 1919, WIS 86 was formed to travel along present-day WIS 73 from WIS 18 (now US 10) in Neillsville to WIS 16 (later WIS 29, now CTH-X) in Withee. This routing was eventually relocated in 1924 after WIS 73 extended northwestward, superseding the old route in the process. On the new route, WIS 56 traveled from WIS 13 (now CTH-G) in Ogema to WIS 10 (now CTH-S) in Tomahawk.

In 1956, WIS 86 extended northwest along former CTH-A (now CTH-O) to US 8 east of Catawba. In the fall of 1983, WIS 86 extended eastward towards the newly built US 51 Tomahawk bypass. By 1993, most of the 1956 northwestern extension was reverted to its county maintenance, replacing with CTH-O in the process. As a result, WIS 86 was truncated back to WIS 13, this time at the Ogema bypass.

Major intersections

See also

References

External links

086
Transportation in Price County, Wisconsin
Transportation in Lincoln County, Wisconsin